The Nazmiyal Collection, based in New York City, is a company that buys & sells, repairs and restores  antique and decorative carpets and textiles. 

The Nazmiyal Collection was founded in 1980 by Jason Nazmiyal. The collection features a  gallery with carpets from Persia, Turkey, the Caucasus, China, Egypt, Europe, Morocco and the Americas, including rare carpets from the 16th century, and textiles from the 4th century.

The organisation provides historical information on the major periods of carpet production throughout the Middle East, the Americas and Europe. The various periods are illustrated by pieces housed in museums throughout the world.

Items in the collection have been used as backdrops in exhibitions of works by Paul Thek, an artist at the Whitney Museum.

References

External links

Rugs and carpets
Shops in New York City